Schistura rara is a species of ray-finned fish, a stone loach, in the genus Schistura. The species is found in the Bei River in Guangdong, China.

References

R
Fish described in 1987